The list of most visited museums in the Netherlands contains the museums in the Netherlands with more than 250,000 visitors per year. Thirteen of these museums are located in Amsterdam, the country's capital.

See also
List of museums in the Netherlands
List of most visited art museums in the world

References

Museums in the Netherlands
 
Most